Akuntsu is a Tupian language of Brazil. Peaceful contact with the Akuntsu people was only made in 1995; they had been massacred by cattle ranchers in the 1980s. The Akuntsu language is spoken only by members of the tribe and not fully understood by any outsider.

It is considered unlikely that the Akuntsu language or culture will survive following the deaths of the tribe's remaining members. For this reason several observers have described the tribe as the victims of genocide. The neighbouring Kanoê have been similarly reduced in number through contact with settlers, as were the people of a man recently encountered living alone in the Igarapé Omerê reserve who is apparently the sole survivor of his tribe.

References

Further reading

External links

Phonological Inventory 
 TuLaR (Tupian Languages Resources)

Tupian languages
Endangered Tupian languages
Mamoré–Guaporé linguistic area